Dioridium is a genus of beetles in the family Cerambycidae, containing the following species:

 Dioridium borgmeieri (Lane, 1972)
 Dioridium hirsutum Zajciw, 1961

References

Eburiini